This is a list of Romanian Air Force and Romanian Air Corps aircraft, those types in service since its formation in 1913, and also those types that are currently in service. The aircraft are listed in alphabetic or chronological order.

Active

NATO programmes

Beginnings & World War I

Captive balloons

Captured

Interwar period

World War II

Interned 
The list includes all airplanes that arrived from Slovakia (following the Slovak–Hungarian War) and Poland in 1939.

Captured

Post War period & Cold War

Post-1990

See also
Romanian Naval Aviation
Romavia
List of equipment of the Romanian Armed Forces/Air Force

References
Notes

Bibliography

 
 Dénes Bernád. Rumanian Air Force: The Prime Decade, 1938-1947. Carrollton, TX: Squadron/Signal Publications, Inc., 1999. .
 
 
 
 
 Vasile Tudor. "Modernizarea aviatiei militare romane" Orizont Aviatic magazine no. 26, December 2004.

External links
Official site of the Romanian Air Force
Order of Battle of the Romanian Air Force

Romanian Air Force
Romanian military-related lists